Trachyzelotes lyonneti is a species of ground spider in the family Gnaphosidae. It is found in Macaronesia, a range from Mediterranean to Central Asia, has been introduced into the United States, Mexico, Peru, and Brazil.

References

Gnaphosidae
Articles created by Qbugbot
Spiders described in 1826